Su Wei may refer to:

Su Wei (politician) (542–623), high-level official of the Chinese dynasty Sui Dynasty
Su Wei (athlete) (born 1982), Chinese long-distance runner
Su Wei (basketball) (born 1989), Chinese professional basketball player
Hsieh Su-wei (born 1986), Taiwanese professional tennis player